Taiping Township is a township in Wudalianchi, Heihe, Heilongjiang, China. , it has eight villages under its administration:
Taiping Village
Changgeng Village
Ping'an Village
Nanquan Village
Zhenxing Village
Qingmin Village
Qingfeng Village
Aimin Village

References 

Township-level divisions of Heilongjiang
Wudalianchi